The Jaslovské Bohunice Nuclear Power Plant (NPP) (abbr. EBO) is a complex of nuclear reactors situated 2.5 km from the village of Jaslovské Bohunice in the Trnava District in western Slovakia.

Bohunice NPP consists of two plants: V1 and V2. Both plants contain two reactor units. The plant was connected to the national power network in stages in the period between 1978 and 1985. The four power reactors are pressurized water reactors of the Soviet VVER-440 design. 
 
Annual electricity generation averages about 12,000 GWh. 
Upon development of a district heating supply network in the town of Trnava near Bohunice NPP, V2 switched to co-generation. Part of this system is a heat feeder line commissioned in 1987. In 1997 a heat feeder line to Leopoldov and Hlohovec has begun, branching off from the Trnava line.

Bohunice A1 (shut down)
The A1 is a nuclear reactor situated on the Jaslovské Bohunice site. The A1 power plant was built between 1958 and 1972, and it was the first nuclear power plant in Czechoslovakia. It had one experimental reactor, the KS-150, designed in Czechoslovakia, which used non-enriched uranium as a fuel. Unlike conventional reactors, refuelling was carried out with the reactor in operation.  From the beginning, however, there were many problems with the operation of the reactor and a number of accidents occurred, what was related to the reactor's experimental design. Two serious accidents occurred at the A1 power plant. The first accident occurred in 1976, during the replacement of fuel cells. Two people lost their lives during this accident. A second major accident occurred during refuelling on February 22, 1977. This accident was rated as an accident of the 4th degree according to INES. After the second major accident, a decision was made to shut down the reactor because it was expensive to repair it after the accident, and the operation of the reactor was inefficient. Czechoslovakia decided to build additional conventional Soviet reactors of the VVER type instead, which have a higher power output with a more efficient operational process. The A1 power plant was closed and it is undergoing a decommissioning and cleanup process.

Bohunice V1 (shut down)
As a condition of accession into the European Union (2004) Slovakia was required to deactivate the two reactors at the V1 plant. A provision in the accession treaty allowed for reactivation in case of an emergency.

The V1 plant was exempted from Slovenské Elektrárne sale to Enel and transferred to JAVYS, a national nuclear decommissioning company fully owned by the state.
The first reactor was shut down at the end of 2006, the second on the last day of 2008.

The Russia-Ukraine gas dispute in January 2009 disrupted natural gas supplies and electricity generation. On January 10, 2009 the Slovak government ordered the second reactor, then still undergoing a shutdown procedure, to be returned into power-generation-capable mode. Eventually, the reactor was not reconnected to the grid and the final shutdown was resumed.

Bohunice V2 (operating)
Bohunice V2 consists of two second generation VVER-440/213 and went online on August 20, 1984 and December 18, 1985, respectively. In November 2010 both reactors were uprated from 440 MW to 505 MW (gross electrical output) and operation is planned to be maintained until 2025.

Bohunice V3 (planned)
In May 2009 Slovak Prime Minister Robert Fico and Czech PM Jan Fischer announced construction of a new reactor unit at Bohunice. A partnership of the Slovak Nuclear and Decommissioning Company (JAVYS) and the Czech energy company ČEZ will build the plant at a projected cost of around 3.7 billion Euros.
The specification of new reactor has not been settled upon but will be rated at between 600 and 1,600 MWe. Four manufacturers have been mooted as possible suppliers: Mitsubishi, Atomenergoprojekt, Westinghouse and Areva. ČEZ is considering combining this project with their concurrent construction of the third and fourth reactors at Temelín Nuclear Power Station. Such a contract would be worth between 7 and 10 billion Euros. The project of constructing a third and fourth reactor at Temelín was cancelled by ČEZ in April 2013.

Notes

External links

 Presentation about decommissioning of A1
 Electricite de France In Running To Build Slovak Nuclear Plant

Nuclear power stations in Slovakia
Czechoslovakia–Soviet Union relations
Nuclear power stations using VVER reactors